Hekimoğlu İbrahim (died 26 April 1913), known by his epithet Hekimoğlu ("son of a physician" in Turkish), was an Ottoman outlaw and a folk hero. He was born in Hopa, Ottoman Empire (today's Turkey).

Early years
According to the Turkish historians Mithat Sertoğlu and Ayhan Yüksel, Hekimoğlu İbrahim grew up in a farming family in the Yassıtaş village of Fatsa. In the early 1900s, while he was working for the local Chveneburi (Muslim Georgian) landowner, Sefer Agha, he fell in love with his daughter, Fadime. Soon after, Fadime and İbrahim began to meet in secret. One day, a local Chveneburi man, Yusuf, saw the two lovers together and told them their meeting violated the social and religious code of the Chveneburi community, where, in those days, a single girl was forbidden from speaking to a man who was not a close relative.

Following Yusuf's disclosure of the love affair between Hekimoğlu and Fadime, an animosity by Chveneburi people towards the neighbouring Turks developed. To avenge the community honour, a group of Chveneburi men, including Yusuf, tried to kill Hekimoğlu, but he escaped their trap, killing one of the Chveneburi men in the process with his soon-to-become famous M1874 Turkish Peabody-Martini rifle. Fearing an unfair trial, Hekimoğlu refused to surrender himself to the local authority in Fatsa and took refuge in the mountains, becoming an outlaw.

Outlaw and folk hero
Led by Hekimoğlu, a gang of outlaws conducted a campaign of robberies and raids against any landowner or community leader who was rumoured to be mistreating the local population. Hekimoğlu and his gang were said to share some of their bounty with the poor (à la Robin Hood). This led Hekimoğlu to attain a folk hero status and he was given the title "the hero of the all heroes" by the local people.

His gang activities were a significant factor in raising the ethnic tension between the Chveneburi and Turkish communities in Fatsa and in the wider Sanjak (sub-province) of Janik. On 15 December 1908, a telegram was sent from Fatsa to the Minister of the Interior of the Ottoman Empire in Istanbul, the capital, requesting assistance in capturing Hekimoğlu, but due to the assistance and shelter given to him by local Turkish villages, authorities were unsuccessful in capturing him and Hekimoğlu responded by increasing his attacks on the Chveneburi.

Death
The Ottoman Council of State rejected Hekimoğlu's requests for a pardon, and on 26 April 1913, he was killed along with his friend Alan Osman in a 8 hour long shootout with the authorities in his home village of Yassıtaş in Fatsa. His death was documented by an American journalist.

Legacy
Hekimoğlu is recalled in Turkey as a folk hero, almost of legend, who fought against injustice and oppression. In his honour, a folk song titled Hekimoğlu Türküsü was composed. It remains popular throughout Turkey to this day.

aşkı için ölümü göze alan tarihin ilk eşkıyası

20th-century people from the Ottoman Empire
Turkish folk songs
Turkish folklore